Keravnos Keratea F.C. is a professional football club based in Keratea, Greece, currently competing in local league East Attica A (A' EPS.AN.A.).

Background
Athletic Football Club Keravnos Keratea was unofficially founded in 1926 and was finally recognised by the Hellenic Football Federation in 1928.

The club’s name “Keravnos” is the Greek word for "thunder."

History

Local and regional amateur and semi-amateur championships
From 1953 to 2003, Keravnos was a member of the Athens Football Clubs Association, or "EPSA," one of the oldest Greek amateur football club associations, representing teams from Athens Prefecture; the association is a member of the Hellenic Football Federation and organizes a regional football league and cup.

Keratea won the EPSA Cup in 1986, and also reached the Cup Final in 1979 and 1983.

In 2003, Keratea joined the newly established Eastern Attica Football Clubs Association, or "EPSANA."

Keratea won the EPSANA Cup in its first three seasons, in 2003-04, 2004–05, and 2005–06, and then again in 2007-08 and 2012-13.

In 2004-05, Keratea won the national amateur cup, the Greek Football Amateur Cup.

Professional championships
Keratea won the Delta Ethniki Group 9 championship in 2007-08, earning promotion to Gamma Ethniki, the third tier of Greek football, for the first time in the club's history.

In 2008-09, Keratea's first season in Gamma Ethniki, the team finished in 6th-place in the South Group.

Stadium
Keravnos Keratea plays its home matches at Keratea Municipal Stadium in Keratea.  The stadium currently has a seating capacity of 3,500

Achievements

  Delta Ethniki Championship (Semi-Amateur)
 Winners (1): 2007-08 (Group 9)
  Greek Football Amateur Cup  (Semi-amateur)
 Winners (1):  2005
  Eastern Attica Football Clubs Association Cup (Amateur)
 Winners (5):  2003-04, 2004–05, 2005–06, 2007–08, 2012–13
  Eastern Attica Football Clubs Association 1st Division (Amateur)
 Winners (1):  2003-04
  Athens Football Clubs Association (Amateur)
 Winners (1):  1989
  Athens Football Clubs Association Cup (Amateur)
 Winners (1):  1986

References

External links
 Keravnos Keratea - Official site

Association football clubs established in 1928
Football clubs in Attica
1928 establishments in Greece